Gloves is the second and final studio album from Australia indie rock/pop rock band, Operator Please. It was released on 26 April 2010 in Australia and on 31 May 2010 in the UK under Virgin/EMI. Gloves debuted at #20 on the Australian ARIA Albums Chart on 3 May 2010.

Singles
The lead single "Logic" was released on 16 February 2010. 

The video for the second single "Back and Forth" was released on 22 April 2010 and released on 24 May 2010.

"Like Magic" was released as the third single on 30 July 2010, followed by "Volcano" on 1 October 2010 and "Catapult" in January 2011.

Track listing

Charts

References

2010 albums
Operator Please albums
Virgin EMI Records albums